Głużek  is a village in the administrative district of Gmina Wiśniewo, within Mława County, Masovian Voivodeship, in east-central Poland.

Notable residents
 Władysław Skierkowski (1886–1941), a Polish priest, who died in a concentration camp.

References

Villages in Mława County